Alrewas and Fradley, was a large civil parish in the Lichfield district of Staffordshire, England. The parish included the villages of Alrewas, Fradley and Orgreave, and in 2001 had a population of 4,686.

History 
On 25 March 1884 Alrewas Hays, Fradley and Orgreave parishes were merged with Alrewas, on 1 February the parish was renamed from "Alrewas" to "Alrewas & Fradley". on 1 April 2009 it was divided into the two new parishes of Alrewas and Fradley and Streethay.

References

Former civil parishes in Staffordshire
Lichfield District